Ludwig Schweickert (26 April 1915 in Fürth – 11 July 1943 near Oryol, Soviet Union) was a German wrestler who competed in the 1936 Summer Olympics. He was killed in action during World War II.

References

External links
 

1915 births
1943 deaths
Olympic wrestlers of Germany
Wrestlers at the 1936 Summer Olympics
German male sport wrestlers
Olympic silver medalists for Germany
Olympic medalists in wrestling
Sportspeople from Fürth
Medalists at the 1936 Summer Olympics
German Army personnel killed in World War II
20th-century German people
Military personnel from Fürth